USS Brilliant (ID-1329) was the proposed name and hull classification for a tug that never actually served in the United States Navy.

Brilliant was a commercial tug built in 1903 by the Neafie & Levy at Philadelphia, Pennsylvania. During the period of the United States' participation in World War I, the Navy inspected her for possible acquisition and assigned her the hull classification ID-1329 in anticipation of commissioning her as USS Brilliant. However, the Navy never took possession of her, and she remained in civilian service with her owners, the Atlantic Refining Company of Philadelphia.

References

Cancelled ships of the United States Navy
1903 ships
Ships built by Neafie and Levy
World War I merchant ships of the United States
Tugboats of the United States